The European Quality Award is now referred to as the EFQM Excellence Award.

This distinction is awarded annually by the European Foundation for Quality Management to the organisation that is the best proponent in Europe of Total Quality Management.

The historical winners are:
1992 Rank Xerox
1993 Milliken Europe
1994 D2D (Design to Distribution)
1995 Texas Instruments
1996 Brisa (Bridgestone)
1997 SGS-Thomson
1998 TNT UK
1999 Yellow Pages
2000 Nokia
2001 St Mary's College Northern Ireland & Zahnarztpraxis
2002 SAM Mouldings
2003 Bosch Sanayi ve Ticaret AS & Runshaw College & Maxi Coco-Mat SA
2004 Kocaeli Chamber of Industry & YELL
2005 FirstPlus Financial Group & TNT Express 
2006 BMW Chassis and Driveline Systems & Grundfos
2007 Lauaxeta Ikastola Sociedad Cooperativa & The Cedar Foundation & Villa Massa S.r.l. & Tobermore Concrete Products Ltd
2008 Bosch Sanayi ve Ticaret A.S. & Bursagaz & Council for the Curriculum, Examinations & Assessment
2009 Prize Winners Only
2010 Prize Winners Only
2011 Bilim Pharmaceuticals
2012 Robert Bosch GmbH Bamberg Plant
2013 Alpenresort Schwarz
2014 Bosch Bari Plant
2015 BMW AG Werk Regensburg
2016 Prize Winners Only
 Refer to the EFQM Excellence Award page for the full listing

In the past, the award was given to organisations in the following categories:
Large Organisations and Business Units
Operating Units of Companies
Public Sector Organisations
Small and Medium-sized Enterprises (SME) in two categories, 'Independent SMEs' and 'Subsidiaries of Larger Organisations'.

European Quality Prizes are awarded each year by the EFQM. Recipients are organisations that have applied for but not won the European Quality Award; however, the application was of such a high standard that the European Quality Prize is appropriate.

See also
EFQM
Malcolm Baldrige National Quality Award for the USA
Deming Prize for Japan

References

Business and industry awards
Quality awards